Boletellus chrysenteroides is a species of fungus in the family Boletaceae. It was first described as Boletus chrysenteroides by mycologist Wally Snell in 1936. Snell later (1941) transferred the species to Boletellus.

See also
List of North American boletes

References

Fungi of North America
chrysenteroides
Fungi described in 1936